Local elections were held in the United Kingdom in 1982. The elections coincided with rising popularity of the Conservative government and Prime Minister Margaret Thatcher, which was mostly attributed to the Falklands War.  The projected share of the vote was Conservatives 40%, Labour 29%, Liberal-SDP Alliance 27%.

Elections were held in several English boroughs, including all those in London.

The Conservatives held their ground, losing only 98 seats, leaving them with 10,447 seats.

The main opposition Labour Party, under the leadership of Michael Foot, lost 225 seats, finishing with 8,774 councillors.

For the newly formed Liberal-SDP Alliance, the 1982 local elections were the first annual electoral test.  They gained 395 seats and finished with 1,850 councillors. This meant that the Alliance had almost as many votes as Labour, but Labour still had nearly five times as many councillors.

Summary of results

England

London boroughs

In all 32 London boroughs the whole council was up for election.

‡ New ward boundaries

Metropolitan boroughs

Whole council
In 13 metropolitan boroughs the whole council was up for election.

In 13 boroughs there were new ward boundaries, following electoral boundary reviews by the Local Government Boundary Commission for England.

‡ New ward boundaries

Third of council
23 metropolitan borough councils had one third of their seats up for election.

District councils
In 103 districts one third of the council was up for election.

Scotland

Regional councils

References

Local elections 2006. House of Commons Library Research Paper 06/26.
Vote 1999 BBC News
Vote 2000 BBC News

 
Local elections